Luca Zanetti (born 9 November 2002) is an Italian professional footballer who plays as a defender for  club Legnago.

Club career
Formed on Legnago Salus, Zanetti made his senior and Serie D debut on 1 September 2019 against ASD Villafranca.

After won the promotion with the club, made his professional and Serie C debut on 9 December 2020 against Fano.

References

External links
 
 

2002 births
Living people
Italian footballers
Association football defenders
Serie C players
Serie D players
F.C. Legnago Salus players